The Anchorman series is a media franchise initially consisting of three American comedy films – Anchorman: The Legend of Ron Burgundy, Wake Up, Ron Burgundy: The Lost Movie (both 2004), and Anchorman 2: The Legend Continues (2013). The films were produced by Judd Apatow, directed by Adam McKay, and written by McKay and Will Ferrell. The films star Ferrell, Paul Rudd, David Koechner, Steve Carell, and Christina Applegate as Ron Burgundy, Brian Fantana, Champ Kind, Brick Tamland, and Veronica Corningstone, respectively. The films were distributed by DreamWorks Pictures and Paramount Pictures. A podcast series, The Ron Burgundy Podcast, produced by Big Money Players and written by Jake Fogelnest, with Ferrell reprising his role alongside Carolina Barlow, aired for 57 episodes across four seasons on iHeartRadio from February 7, 2019 to August 19, 2021, with a fifth season in active development.

Film series

Anchorman: The Legend of Ron Burgundy (2004)

Ron Burgundy is San Diego's top rated newsman in the male-dominated broadcasting of the '70s, but that's all about to change for Ron and his cronies when an ambitious woman is hired as a new anchor.

The film grossed $85,288,303 in North America, and $5,285,885 in other countries, for a worldwide total of $90,574,188. It received generally positive reviews from critics. Rotten Tomatoes gives the film a score of 66% based on 201 reviews, with an average rating of 6.3/10. The site's consensus reads: "Filled with inspired silliness and quotable lines, Anchorman isn't the most consistent comedy in the world, but Will Ferrell's buffoonish central performance helps keep this portrait of a clueless newsman from going off the rails." Metacritic gave the film a score of 63 out of 100 based on 38 reviews.

Wake Up, Ron Burgundy: The Lost Movie (2004)

Set during Anchorman: The Legend of Ron Burgundy, Anchorman: Wake Up, Ron Burgundy: The Lost Movie follows the KVWN Channel 4 News Team as they investigate the extremist bank-robbing organization "The Alarm Clock".

Unlike the other films in the Anchorman series, Wake Up, Ron Burgundy was released straight-to-video bundled with the home release of Anchorman: The Legend of Ron Burgundy. Wake Up, Ron Burgundy is composed of outtakes from Anchorman: The Legend of Ron Burgundy.

Anchorman 2: The Legend Continues (2013)

With the 70s behind him, San Diego's top rated newsman, Ron Burgundy, returns to take New York's first 24-hour news channel by storm with the help of his best friends.

The film grossed $127.4 million in North America, and $45.6 million in other countries, for a worldwide total of $173.0 million. The review aggregator website Rotten Tomatoes reported a 74% approval rating with an average rating of 6.4/10 based on 199 reviews. The website's consensus reads, "It's just as uneven and loosely structured as the first Anchorman – and while Anchorman 2: The Legend Continues may not be quite as quotable, it's nearly as funny as its predecessor." On Metacritic, it holds a score of 61 out of 100 based on 40 reviews, indicating "generally favorable reviews."

The Ron Burgundy Podcast (2019–2021)
In January 2019, Ferrell announced The Ron Burgundy Podcast with iHeartRadio, written by Jake Fogelnest, to launch the following month, reprising his role weekly to discuss a variety of topics and conduct interviews, lasting 57 episodes across four seasons from February 7, 2019 to August 19, 2021, with a fifth season in active development. On August 8, 2019, Ferrell, as Burgundy, appeared on the late-night talk shows Conan, The Late Show with Stephen Colbert, The Late Late Show with James Corden, The Tonight Show Starring Jimmy Fallon, Late Night with Seth Meyers, and Jimmy Kimmel Live!; all on the same night. The appearances were part of an effort to promote his "comedy routine" and the second season of The Ron Burgundy Podcast.

Cast and characters

Crew

Reception

Box office performance

Critical and public response

Future

On November 13, 2013, Will Ferrell spoke about the possibility of a third main Anchorman film stating: "I'm sure they would, but I don't know. We just want to see what happens with this one and we'll sit down and assess all of that. Right now, we're just enjoying this journey." On December 9, 2013, Steve Carell said "We'll see how this one goes," and "If people like it, maybe 10 years from now we'll do a third."

Director Adam McKay spoke to Empire in February 2014, and ruled out any further Anchorman movies saying "It's done. I think that's it. It was great to do it and it was so fun to work with those guys again, but I think that's it for Ron Burgundy." and when asked if he would do sequels with any character he said "No, that's the last sequel we're gonna do. There’s nothing more fun to me than new characters and a new world. And now we're releasing this alt version, we're totally satisfied. No Anchorman 3."

However, on April 2, 2014, Adam McKay stated that Anchorman 3 could still be a possibility, which went against his previous statement. In an interview with Time, he stated "I said about a month ago that we'd never do a third one, and I realized that was a little too harsh because the truth is, I really don’t know. With these movies, you really don't know how they've played until about two years after they come out, when people see them on repeat viewing." He then also went on to state that "If Anchorman 2 gets that sort of second life, if three, four years from now people start asking us that question a lot and there's an idea, we would be open to that."

In 2018, McKay offered an idea of sending Ron Burgundy to cover the first or second Iraq War. In an interview with CinemaBlend, McKay said "I don't know if you remember the first and even the second Iraq war. Maybe it was mainly the second Iraq war. They embedded journalists and that gave us kind of a whole story idea... I don't want to say too much, but I'll just tell you that embedded journalist, Ron Burgundy, Veronica Corningstone, the news team. That definitely gave us a big idea." In that same year, Steve Carell stated he would reprise his role of Brick Tamland if a third film was made.

Appearances in other media
 On March 28, 2012, Will Ferrell officially announced Anchorman 2: The Legend Continues dressed in character as Ron Burgundy on the late-night talk show Conan. Ferrell would eventually appear again as Burgundy in an interview on Conan to promote the sequel.
 On November 30, 2013, Ferrell co-anchored a newscast on Bismarck, North Dakota's CBS affiliate KXMB-TV in character as Ron Burgundy. The next day, he made a guest appearance on TSN's coverage of the Canadian Olympic Curling Trials from Winnipeg, Manitoba.
 In 2013, Crown Publishing Group published Let Me Off at the Top!: My Classy Life and Other Musings, an 'autobiography' of Ron Burgundy written by Will Ferrell. In November 2013, Ferrell, in character as Burgundy, held a book signing for the biography.
 Also in 2013, to promote Anchorman 2s release, Ferrell appeared as Burgundy in a series of Dodge commercials.
 In December 2013, Ferrell was set to host the evening edition of SportsCenter, but the appearance was canceled in the wake of a press conference involving sexual assault allegations against college football quarterback Jameis Winston.
 On December 19, 2013, Ferrell appeared on Jimmy Kimmel Live! and performed "Ride Like the Wind" in character as Ron Burgundy with Christopher Cross.
 Ferrell appeared in character as Ron Burgundy at the Comedy Central Roast of Justin Bieber in 2015.
 On March 21, 2019, Ferrell, as Burgundy, took part in Fox Sports West's coverage of that night's Los Angeles Kings game. Ferrell called the second period of the Kings' 4–2 win over the San Jose Sharks.

References

External links
 
 
 
 
 The Ron Burgundy Podcast at iHeartRadio
 The Ron Burgundy Podcast at Apple Podcasts

2019 podcast debuts
Audio podcasts
Comedy film series
DreamWorks Pictures films
Film series introduced in 2004
Paramount Pictures franchises
Trilogies